Juan José Veloz Dávila (born 24 September 1982 in Mexico City, Mexico) is an Olympic and national record-holding swimmer for Mexico. He swam for his native country at the 2000, 2004, and 2008 Olympics.

Career
At the 2002 Central American and Caribbean Games, Veloz set the Games Record in the 200 fly at 1:58.45.

As of March 2008, he holds the Mexican records in the 200 fly and 400 IM.
In 2007 he won bronze medal in the Panamerican Games.

References

External links

1982 births
Living people
Swimmers from Mexico City
Mexican male swimmers
Arizona Wildcats men's swimmers
Swimmers at the 1999 Pan American Games
Swimmers at the 2000 Summer Olympics
Swimmers at the 2004 Summer Olympics
Swimmers at the 2007 Pan American Games
Swimmers at the 2008 Summer Olympics
Olympic swimmers of Mexico
Pan American Games bronze medalists for Mexico
Pan American Games medalists in swimming
Medalists at the 2007 Pan American Games
Central American and Caribbean Games gold medalists for Mexico
Central American and Caribbean Games silver medalists for Mexico
Competitors at the 1998 Central American and Caribbean Games
Competitors at the 2002 Central American and Caribbean Games
Competitors at the 2006 Central American and Caribbean Games
Central American and Caribbean Games medalists in swimming
21st-century Mexican people